Jaëll Hattu (born 15 February 1998) is a Dutch professional footballer who plays for the Jong-squad of NEC, as a midfielders.

Career
After playing for VVV-Venlo, Hattu moved to PSV in 2013 and turned professional in July 2017. He made his professional debut with Jong PSV in the Eerste Divisie in the 2017–18 season.

Ahead of the 2019-20 season, Hattu joined Jong NEC.

References

1998 births
Living people
Dutch footballers
VVV-Venlo players
PSV Eindhoven players
Jong PSV players
Eerste Divisie players
Association football midfielders
Footballers from Venlo